"People of the Sun" is a song by Armenian child singer Betty.  It represented Armenia at the Junior Eurovision Song Contest 2014 in Marsa, Malta, placing 3rd with 146 points.

Music video
The music video was released on YouTube on 29 October 2014, and is a unique "selfie video," which includes a bike trip around Yerevan and playing a guitar.  This was taken from the humorous point of view from Wiwibloggs: "Do not try this at home!"

Live Performances

National Selection
Betty first sang "People of the Sun" at Armenia's national selection for JESC 2014 on 14 September.  At the end of transmission, she earned the right to represent Armenia at the 12th edition of the Junior Eurovision Song Contest in Malta.

Junior Eurovision
Betty's performance for Malta was very different from the national selection.  For the actual Junior Eurovision Song Contest itself, Betty was joined by two dancers and three acrobats.  At the close of the voting, Armenia placed 3rd in a field of 16 songs, scoring 146 points.

External links
 Official Music Video

References

Armenian songs
Junior Eurovision songs
2014 singles
2014 songs